Pusiola ochreata is a moth in the subfamily Arctiinae. It was described by George Hampson in 1901. It is found in the Democratic Republic of the Congo, Kenya and Malawi.

References

Moths described in 1901
Lithosiini
Moths of Africa